Heizhuanghu station is a subway station on the Line 7 of the Beijing Subway.

History 
The station opened on December 28, 2019.

Station layout 
The station has an underground island platform.

Exits 
There are 2 exits, lettered B and D. Exit D is accessible.

References

Beijing Subway stations in Chaoyang District
Railway stations in China opened in 2019